Penzing is the 14th borough of Vienna and consists of the localities of Penzing, Breitensee, Baumgarten, Hütteldorf and Hadersdorf-Weidlingau. In the west, it shares a border with Purkersdorf and Mauerbach. A large portion of the district is made up of greenery, including the Steinhof park, the Dehnepark and a portion of the Wienerwald.

Sights 
 Fuchs Mansion: Mansion and studio of the painter Ernst Fuchs
 Otto-Wagner-Hospital: Hospital building erected from 1904 to 1907 as Niederösterreichische Landes-Heil- und Pflegeanstalt für Nerven- und Geisteskranke 'Am Steinhof''' ("Lower Austrian State Healing and Care Institution for Nervous and Mental Patients Am Steinhof"). The famous Jugendstil architect Otto Wagner participated in the planning. The complex includes the Kirche am Steinhof, the Jugendstiltheater'' and a memorial site for Nazi crimes in medicine.
 Fuhrmannhaus: oldest still existing building in the west of Vienna with a baroque fresco hall
 Weststadion: Home of SK Rapid Vienna

People 

 Otto Wagner (1841 – 1918), born here
 Count Franz Conrad von Hötzendorf (1852 – 1925), born here
 Gustav Klimt (1862, Baumgarten – 1918), painter
 Ernest Augustus, Duke of Brunswick (1887 – 1953), born here
 Siegfried Marcus, buried here
 Jörg Lanz von Liebenfels (1874-1954), born here

References

External links 
 Penzing on Vienna's official website
 Weather and webcam

 
Districts of Vienna